James Hirsch may refer to:

 James S. Hirsch, American journalist and author
 James G. Hirsch (1922–1987), American physician and biomedical researcher